Propter hoc  may refer to:

 Cum hoc ergo propter hoc (Latin: "with this, therefore because of this"), an informal fallacy suggesting that when two events happen together, one must cause the other
 Post hoc ergo propter hoc (Latin: "after this, therefore because of this"), an informal fallacy suggesting that when an event follows another event, the earlier event caused the later one
 "Post Hoc, Ergo Propter Hoc" (The West Wing), an episode of the television series The West Wing

See also
 Post hoc (disambiguation)